Leucopogon microcarpus is a species of flowering plant in the heath family Ericaceae and is endemic to the southwest of Western Australia. It is a low, compact shrub with hairy young branchlets, narrowly elliptic, narrowly egg-shaped or linear leaves and erect, compact clusters of 3 to 9 white, tube-shaped flowers in upper leaf axils or on the ends of branches.

Description
The edges of the leaves are usually turned down or rolled under, the lower surface a paler shade of green.

Taxonomy and naming
Leucopogon microcarpus was first formally described in 2012 by Michael Clyde Hislop in the journal Nuytsia from specimens he collected near Nannup in 2004. The specific epithet (microcarpus) means "small fruit".

Distribution and habitat
This leucopogon almost always grows in jarrah forest and occurs on and near the Whicher Range in the Jarrah Forest, Swan Coastal Plain and Warren bioregions of southwestern Western Australia.

Conservation status
Leucopogon microcarpus is listed as "not threatened" by the Government of Western Australia Department of Biodiversity, Conservation and Attractions.

References

microcarpus
Ericales of Australia
Flora of Western Australia
Plants described in 2012